Howard Fondyke (born 5 January 1990) is an Australian footballer who played for Perth Glory and APIA Leichhardt.

Career
After playing in Perth's inaugural National Youth League team, Howard signed a 2-year contract prior to the 2009/10 season. He failed to play a single game in that campaign. However, he did feature heavily in the club's youth team for that season, even coming on in the 58' against Gold Coast United during the A-League National Youth League Grand Final on 20 March 2010.

Since leaving Perth, Fondyke has been trialling in Scotland with Scottish Premier League club St.Mirren, as well as newly promoted First Division side Ayr United, in the hope he will be signed for the upcoming 2010–11 Season.

A-League career statistics 
(Correct as of 21 March 2011)

References

External links
 Perth Glory profile

A-League Men players
Australian soccer players
Living people
Perth Glory FC players
1990 births
Australian Institute of Sport soccer players
Hume City FC players
Bonnyrigg White Eagles FC players
National Premier Leagues players
Association football midfielders